Hubert Jean Victor, Marquis de Saint-Simon (11 February 1782  – 18 March 1865) was a French diplomat and colonial administrator. He served as Governor General for Inde française in the Second French Colonial Empire during the July Monarchy.

References

1782 births
1865 deaths
French colonial governors and administrators
Governors of French India
People of the July Monarchy
Rouvroy family

Dukes of Saint-Simon